Simona Babčáková (born 21 February 1973) is a Czech actress.

Life and career
Babčáková graduated from the Zlín School of Art. She first performed at the Zlín Municipal Theatre and later went on to work at Prague's Divadlo v Dlouhé and Dejvické divadlo. She has twice been nominated for an Alfréd Radok Award.

She has appeared in numerous films, including Shameless (2008) and Alois Nebel (2011), as well television series, such as Comeback (2008–2011) and Ohnivý kuře (2016–2018).

In 2021, together with Martin Prágr, she participated in the eleventh season of the reality series StarDance.

Selected filmography

Film

Television

References

External links
 
 

1973 births
Living people
Czech film actresses
Czech television actresses
People from Šumperk
21st-century Czech actresses